The Symphony No. 5 is a composition for baritone, mezzo-soprano, and orchestra by the American composer John Harbison.  The work was commissioned by the Boston Symphony Orchestra under the conductor James Levine.  It was given its world premiere in Boston on April 17, 2008 by the mezzo-soprano Kate Lindsey, the baritone Nathan Gunn, and the Boston Symphony Orchestra directed by James Levine.  The text of the piece is set to Orpheus and Eurydice by Czesław Miłosz, Relic by Louise Glück, and the Sonnets to Orpheus by Rainer Maria Rilke.

Composition
The symphony has a duration of roughly 35 minutes and is composed in four movements:
Con fuoco
Andante cantabile
Grave
Lento

Though it was originally conceived as a purely orchestral work, Harbison decided to add vocal parts to the symphony at the suggestion of James Levine.  The first two movements are set to the text of Czesław Miłosz's Orpheus and Eurydice, while the third and fourth movements are set to Louise Glück's Relic and Rainer Maria Rilke's Sonnets to Orpheus, respectively.

Instrumentation
The work is composed for solo baritone and mezzo-soprano and a large orchestra comprising three flutes (3rd doubling piccolo), three oboes (3rd doubling English horn), three clarinets (2nd doubling E-flat clarinet; 3rd doubling bass clarinet), two bassoons, contrabassoon, four horns, two trumpets, two trombones, tuba, timpani, three percussionists, piano, harp, electric guitar, and strings.

Reception
The symphony has received a positive response from music critics.  Reviewing the world premiere, Jeremy Eichler of The Boston Globe called it "an accomplished four-movement work that has extremely prominent roles for baritone and mezzo-soprano."  He continued:
David Wright of the Boston Classical Review described the piece as "an arresting meditation on grief and the hereafter."  At a later performance of the piece, Jeremy Eichler called it "an artful and moving work" and wrote, "The movements based on Glück and Rilke fill out the picture, the latter set with the two vocal lines in vivid canon. No detail feels incidental, every gesture speaks."

References

5
2007 compositions
Harbison 5
Music commissioned by the Boston Symphony Orchestra
Musical settings of poems by Czesław Miłosz
Musical settings of poems by Rainer Maria Rilke